In software development, a leaky abstraction is an abstraction that leaks details that it is supposed to abstract away.

As coined by Joel Spolsky, the Law of Leaky Abstractions states:

This statement highlights a particularly problematic cause of software defects: the reliance of the software developer on an abstraction's infallibility.

Spolsky's article gives examples of an abstraction that works most of the time, but where a detail of the underlying complexity cannot be ignored, thus leaking complexity out of the abstraction back into the software that uses the abstraction.

History
The term "leaky abstraction" was popularized in 2002 by Joel Spolsky. An earlier paper by Kiczales describes some of the issues with imperfect abstractions and presents a potential solution to the problem by allowing for the customization of the abstraction itself.

Effect on software development
As systems become more complex, software developers must rely upon more abstractions. Each abstraction tries to hide complexity, letting a developer write software that "handles" the many variations of modern computing.

However, this law claims that developers of reliable software must learn the abstraction's underlying details anyway.

Examples
Spolsky's article cites many examples of leaky abstractions that create problems for software development:
 The TCP/IP protocol stack is the combination of TCP, which tries to provide reliable delivery of information, running on top of IP, which provides only 'best-effort' service. When IP loses a packet TCP has to retransmit it, which takes additional time. Thus TCP provides the abstraction of a reliable connection, but the implementation details leak through in the form of potentially variable performance (throughput and latency both suffer when data has to be retransmitted), and the connection can still break entirely.
 Iterating over a large two-dimensional array can have radically different performance if done horizontally rather than vertically, depending on the order in which elements are stored in memory. One direction may vastly increase cache misses and page faults, both of which greatly delay access to memory.
 The SQL language abstracts away the procedural steps for querying a database, allowing one to merely define what one wants. But certain SQL queries are thousands of times slower than other logically equivalent queries. On an even higher level of abstraction, ORM systems, which isolate object-oriented code from the implementation of object persistence using a relational database, still force the programmer to think in terms of databases, tables, and native SQL queries as soon as performance of ORM-generated queries becomes a concern.
 Although network file systems like NFS and SMB let one treat files on remote machines as if they were local, the connection to the remote machine may slow down or break, and the file stops acting as if it were local.
 The ASP.NET web forms programming platform, not to be confused with ASP.NET MVC, abstracts away the difference between HTML code to handle clicking on a hyperlink (<a>) and code to handle clicking on a button. However, ASP.NET needs to hide the fact that in HTML there is no way to submit a form from a hyperlink. It does this by generating a few lines of JavaScript and attaching an onclick handler to the hyperlink. However, if the end user has JavaScript disabled, the ASP.NET application malfunctions. Furthermore, one cannot naively think of event handlers in ASP.NET in the same way as in a desktop GUI framework such as Windows Forms; due to the asynchronous nature of the Web, processing event handlers in ASP.NET requires exchanging data with the server and reloading the form.
Git's interface is another example for leaky abstraction as explained in this article.

See also
 Abstraction inversion
 Dependency inversion principle
 Essential complexity
 Modular programming
 Separation of concerns

References

Abstraction